McDonald Lake, also known as Rafferty Reservoir, is a reservoir in south-east Saskatchewan, Canada. It was created when the Rafferty Dam was built on the Souris River in 1994. Before the dam was built that flooded the Souris Valley, McDonald Lake was a small lake and marsh on the valley floor adjacent to the Souris River.

The reservoir provides water to the Shand Power Station and to the city of Estevan. A 10-kilometre long pipeline supplies the power station and a 9.2-km long pipeline, which originates along the Souris River river bed at the bottom of the reservoir, brings water to the Estevan water treatment plant. The water pipeline that brings water to Estevan was completed in 2020 after a three-year project that changed the source of Estevan's drinking water away from Boundary Dam Reservoir.

Mainprize Regional Park 
Mainprize Regional Park is a park in the rural municipality of RM of Cymri No. 36. The regional park is operated by a park authority with offices in Midale. The park includes an 18-hole golf course, Pederson Place (a  multi-purpose hall), a beach area on McDonald Lake, water plant, camp groups, and a residential cottage subdivisions. The park is located near the north-west end of the lake, on the eastern shore.

Rafferty Dam 

Rafferty Dam is located at the south-eastern corner of the lake, 4.8 km upstream from Estevan. It was built in conjunction with the Grant Devine Dam (formally known as Alameda Dam), which was built further downstream on Moose Mountain Creek, which is a tributary of the Souris River. Both dams are operated by the Saskatchewan Water Security Agency. The dam and reservoir provide flood control along the Souris River, irrigation, and recreation.

The height of the top of the dam is 555 metres above sea level. The maximum height available for flood control is 554 metres. The normal full supply level is 550.5 and the normal drawdown level is 549.5 metres. The maximum draw down is 547.5 metres above sea level. At full supply, the reservoir covers an area of 4,881 hectares.

A 10-kilometre long spillway connects the Boundary Dam Reservoir to McDonald Lake, allowing excess water to flow into McDonald Lake. The flow can also be reversed if necessary.

Gallery

See also 
Lake Darling Dam
2011 Souris River flood
Boundary Dam Power Station
List of dams and reservoirs in Canada
List of lakes of Saskatchewan
List of protected areas of Saskatchewan
Tourism in Saskatchewan

References

External links 
Park Description

Lakes of Saskatchewan
Dams in Saskatchewan
Dams completed in 1994
Cymri No. 36, Saskatchewan
Division No. 2, Saskatchewan